Yashpal Singh may refer to:
 Yashpal Singh (cricketer)
 Yashpal Singh (politician)